The People's Council, formerly the Supreme Council, is the regional parliament of the Donetsk People's Republic, a disputed entity annexed as a federal subject by Russia from Ukraine in 2022 during the Russian invasion of Ukraine.

History
The first legislative body of the Donetsk People's Republic was the Supreme Council, which was established by pro-Russian protesters in early April 2014. It is not clear as to what the composition of this body was. That body adopted a constitution on 14 May 2014, after having held a referendum on independence from Ukraine. This constitution provided for the establishment of a new body, to replace the Supreme Council, called the People's Council. Elections to the People's Council were held on 2 November 2014. The political party Donetsk Republic, which includes the Communist Party of the Donetsk People's Republic, gained a majority of the seats in the Council with the 68,53% and 68 seats. Free Donbas, which includes the Russian-nationalist New Russia Party, gained the 31.65% and 32 seats. 

The body is presided over by the Chairman of the People's Council. The position was first held by Andrey Purgin but he was stripped of his position and detained under charges of disrupting and attempting to destabilize a meeting. Denis Pushilin succeeded Purgin on 4 September 2015 and stayed in office until 14 December 2018 when he was replaced by Olga Makeeva. Soon after she was succeeded by Vladimir Bidyovka on 20 November 2018.

In 2016, blogger Stanislav Vasyn described the parliament as an absurd and mock structure.

References

External links 

 

Politics of the Donetsk People's Republic
Unicameral legislatures
Donetsk